Phyllonorycter erinaceae is a moth of the family Gracillariidae. It is found in Spain.

The wingspan is 9.2–10 mm. The forewing ground colour is ochreous orange, with a golden sheen. The hindwings are greyish brown. Adults have been recorded on wing from June to July, probably in one generation per year.

Etymology
The species is named for the host plant.

References

Moths described in 2013
erinaceae
Moths of Europe